W. Downwood was a 19th-century footballer who played in defence for Burslem Port Vale.

Career
Downwood joined Burslem Port Vale in June 1892. He made his debut for the club at right-half in a 2–0 loss to Ardwick at Hyde Road on 12 September 1892. He was only selected for a further three Second Division games and one FA Cup match before being released from the Athletic Ground at the end of the season.

Career statistics
Source:

References

Year of birth missing
Year of death missing
English footballers
Association football defenders
Port Vale F.C. players
English Football League players